opened in the Nibutani area of Biratori, Hokkaidō, Japan in 1998, the year after Nibutani Dam was completed. The Museum documents the natural and cultural history of life along the Saru River and has information on nearby chashi. The "Cultural Landscape along the Sarugawa River resulting from Ainu Tradition and Modern Settlement" has been designated an Important Cultural Landscape.

See also
 Nibutani Ainu Culture Museum
 Cultural Landscapes of Japan
 List of Historic Sites of Japan (Hokkaidō)
 Hokkaido Museum
 Ainu culture

References

External links
 Nibutani Ainu Culture Museum

Biratori, Hokkaido
Museums in Hokkaido
Museums established in 1998
1998 establishments in Japan